Liga Portuguesa de Futebol Profissional and Bwin International Ltd v Departamento de Jogos da Santa Casa da Misericórdia de Lisboa (2009) C‑42/07 is an EU law case, concerning the free movement of services in the European Union.

Facts
The Liga Portuguesa de Futebol Profissional (the Portugal football league) and Bwin Ltd (an online gambling company in Gibraltar) claimed that fines from the Departamento de Jogos were contrary to the TFEU article 56 (ex article 49 TEC) on freedom to provide services, as well as freedom of establishment and free movement of payments. The Departamento de Jogos monopolised gambling in Portugal, and it argued this was justified under TFEU article 52 (referred to by art 62). A law prohibited games of chance via the internet. The Departamento de Jogos ran, for example, the Portuguese national lottery, established in 1783, and continued with people drawing numbers by lots. It allowed the Totobola for betting on football and Totogolo for betting on the number of goals. It imposed fines of €65k on Liga and €74,500 on Bwin for administrative offences of organising internet gaming that conflicted with the Santa Casa.

Judgment
The Court of Justice, Grand Chamber, held that the ban would be justifiable. Gambling was a particular problem, and fraud had an increased likelihood over the internet, so a full ban was proportionate toward the aim pursued.

See also

European Union law

Notes

References

European Union services case law
Gambling case law
2009 in case law
Gambling in Gibraltar
Primeira Liga
Online gambling
2009 in Portuguese sport
2009 in Gibraltar
Sports betting